Otsego Township is one of twelve townships in Steuben County, Indiana, United States. As of the 2010 census, its population was 2,575 and it contained 1,839 housing units.

Geography
Lakes in this township include Ball Lake, Fee Lake, Hamilton Lake, Jackson Lake, Johnson Lake and Round Lake. The stream of Black Creek runs through this township.

Cities and towns
 Hamilton (north three-quarters)

Unincorporated towns
 Clarks Landing at 
 Forest Park at 
 Fountain Park at 
 Island Park at 
 Oakwood at 
 Otsego Center at 
 Penn Park at 
 Ravinia Oaks at 
 Russels Point at 
(This list is based on USGS data and may include former settlements.)

Adjacent townships
 Scott Township (north)
 York Township (northeast)
 Richland Township (east)
 Troy Township, DeKalb County (southeast)
 Franklin Township, DeKalb County (south)
 Smithfield Township, DeKalb County (southwest)
 Steuben Township (west)
 Pleasant Township (northwest)

Cemeteries
The township contains five cemeteries: Carter, Hamilton, North Otsego, Otsego Center and Teegardin.

Major highways
  Indiana State Road 1
  Indiana State Road 427

References
 U.S. Board on Geographic Names (GNIS)
 United States Census Bureau cartographic boundary files

External links

 Indiana Township Association
 United Township Association of Indiana

Townships in Steuben County, Indiana
Townships in Indiana